Pennsylvania Railroad Freight Building is a historic freight station, warehouse and showroom building located in the University City neighborhood of Philadelphia, Pennsylvania. It was built by the Pennsylvania Railroad in 1929, and is a six-story, flat roofed building in the Art Deco style.  The first floor is clad in limestone and the upper stories are of buff-colored brick.  Each floor contains approximately 88,000 square feet. 

From 1956 to 1993, it was the GE Re-entry Systems facility, where "thousands of engineers and technicians who solved the problem of vehicles successfully reentering the Earth's atmosphere" for NASA. Among the achievements of the men and women working at the facility is "the recovery of the first man-made object from orbit," a unique milestone for humanity. Generations of University of Pennsylvania and Drexel University students who worked there know it as "The GE Building". For this work, The American Institute of Aeronautics and Astronautics (AIAA) designated it as an Historic Aerospace Site in 2007.

The building has been converted to residential use and is now known as the Left Bank.

It was added to the National Register of Historic Places in 1999.

Gallery

References

External links
 The Left Bank

Pennsylvania Railroad
Commercial buildings on the National Register of Historic Places in Philadelphia
Art Deco architecture in Pennsylvania
Transport infrastructure completed in 1929
University City, Philadelphia